Airborne Warning and Control System, or AWACS, may refer to:

 Airborne early warning and control (AEW&C), a more general term for the general type of aircraft used in this role
 Boeing E-3 Sentry, the aircraft developed under the United States Air Force's "Airborne Warning and Control System" program